The Yellow Ribbon Handicap (formerly known as the Palomar Handicap) is an American Thoroughbred horse race held annually at Del Mar Racetrack in Del Mar, California.  The Grade II race is run on turf at a distance of one and one-sixteenth miles (8.5 furlongs) and is open to fillies and mares, age three and up.

The Palomar Handicap was first run in 1945 as a six furlong race on dirt for three-year-olds. It was not run again until 1952 when it was made an event for three-year-old fillies. After being put on hiatus again, it became an annual event in 1955. Since 1970, it has been contested on turf. From its inception, the race has been contested at various distances:
 6 furlongs : 1945–1969
 7.5 furlongs : 1970–1976
 8 furlongs (1 mile) – 1977–1987
 8.5 furlongs ( miles) : 1988–present

It was raced in two divisions in 1970, 1971, 1973, 1982, and 1991.

This race is now called the Yellow Ribbon Handicap.  (The original Yellow Ribbon Stakes run during the Oak Tree Racing Association Meeting is now called the Rodeo Drive Stakes.)

Records
Speed  record: (at current distance of 8.5 furlongs) 
 1:39.67 – Mea Domina (2006)

Most wins:
 2 – Tranquility Lake (2000, 2001)
2 – Gotta Have Her (2009, 2010)
 2 – She's Not Here (2015, 2016)
2 – Cambodia (2017,2018)

Most wins by an owner:
 3 – Juddmonte Farms (1992, 2004, 2005)

Most wins by a jockey:
 5 – Bill Shoemaker (1952, 1971, 1973, 1979, 1982)

Most wins by a trainer:
 8 – Robert J. Frankel (1986, 1988, 1991, 1994, 1999, 2004, 2005, 2007)
 7 – Charles Wittingham (1973, 1974, 1979, 1980, 1981, 1982, 1989)

Winners

† In 1984, Royal Heroine finished first but was disqualified and set back to third.

References

 The 2009 Palomar Handicap at the NTRA

Del Mar Racetrack
Horse races in California
Graded stakes races in the United States
Mile category horse races for fillies and mares
Turf races in the United States
Recurring sporting events established in 1945